Dawn Robberds was an Australian tennis player. She won the girls doubles title at the Australian Championship (now the Australian Open) in 1959 and 1960. She also won the City of Orange Tennis Club trophy for girls singles in 1957.

References

Australian female tennis players
Year of birth missing (living people)
Living people